Shahrak-e Emam Hoseyn (also Romanized as Shahrak-e Emām Ḩoseyn; also known as Bard-e Ghamchī) is a village in Abezhdan Rural District, Abezhdan District, Andika County, Khuzestan Province, Iran. At the 2006 census, its population was 102, in 16 families.

References 

Populated places in Andika County